TPC at Piper Glen (full name Tournament Players Club at Piper Glen)  is a private golf club located in Charlotte, North Carolina.

History
The Arnold Palmer designed championship golf course is a member of the Tournament Players Club network operated by the PGA Tour. In 2007, the facility was sold to the Heritage Golf Group, but retained its TPC branding under a licensing agreement.
Between 1990 and 2001 TPC at Piper Glen hosted the Home Depot Invitational, a tournament on the Champions Tour schedule.

Design
TPC Piper Glen is designed for a unique combination of beauty, challenge and pure playability. The stunning layout is said to bring out the best of the rolling North Carolina terrain – with natural rock outcroppings, lush oak trees and quiet lake inlets.

Record
The course record from the back tees is held by PGA pro Brendon de Jonge at -12 (60).

References

External links
Official site

Golf clubs and courses in North Carolina
Sports venues in Charlotte, North Carolina
1988 establishments in North Carolina